Starfleet is a fictional organization in the Star Trek media franchise. Within this fictional universe, Starfleet is a uniformed space force maintained by the United Federation of Planets ("the Federation") as the principal means for conducting deep space exploration, research, defense, peacekeeping, and diplomacy (although Starfleet predates the Federation, having originally been an Earth organization, as shown by the television series Star Trek: Enterprise). While most of Starfleet's members are human and it has been headquartered on Earth, hundreds of other species are also represented. Most of the franchise's protagonists are Starfleet commissioned officers.

History
During production of early episodes of the original series, several details of the makeup of the Star Trek universe had yet to be worked out, including the operating authority for the USS Enterprise. The terms Star Service ("The Conscience of the King"), Spacefleet Command ("The Squire of Gothos"), United Earth Space Probe Agency ("Charlie X" and "Tomorrow Is Yesterday"), and Space Central ("Miri") were all used to refer to the Enterprises operating authority, before the term "Starfleet" became widespread from the episode "Court Martial" onwards.

However, references to the United Earth Space Probe Agency, and its abbreviation UESPA, are to be found in episodes of later series. For example, the Friendship One probe (launched, on the fictional timeline, in 2067) is marked with the letters UESPA-1 in the Star Trek: Voyager episode "Friendship One". Other background props included additional UESPA references, such as Captain Jean-Luc Picard's family album in Star Trek Generations. During the production of Star Trek: Enterprise, some larger Starfleet insignia designs included the name "United Earth Space Probe Agency".

Multiple Star Trek: Enterprise episodes refer to Starfleet having started operation some time between 2112 and 2136, when it funded research begun by Zefram Cochrane and Henry Archer, which led to the first successful flight of Warp-3 vessels in the 2140s.  This research is said to have evolved into the NX Program, which led to Starfleet launching its first Warp 5–capable starship, Enterprise (NX-01), in 2151, followed by Columbia (NX-02), in 2155, as well as other vessels.

Starfleet acts under the Prime Directive, a policy of non-interference with pre-warp worlds, such as interference in their internal politics. This is said not to be a human construct, but stems from policies originally implemented by the Vulcans, who regarded an alien civilization's attainment of warp speed as the sign of their importance and a reason for making first contact with them. The Prime Directive and Starfleet's first-contact policies are at the center of several episodes in each Star Trek series and the film Star Trek: First Contact.

Starfleet Headquarters is shown to be located on Earth, northeast of the Golden Gate Bridge in the present-day Fort Baker area. Starfleet Academy is located in the same general area. Additionally, various episodes show Starfleet operating a series of starbases throughout Federation territory, as ground facilities, or as space stations in planetary orbit or in deep space. One example is Deep Space 9, a station near a wormhole commanded by Benjamin Sisko after its transfer from the Cardassian Empire.

Mission
Starfleet has been shown to handle scientific, defense, and diplomatic missions, although its primary mandate seems to be peaceful exploration in the search for sentient life, as seen in the mission statements of different incarnations of the USS Enterprise. The flagship of Starfleet is often considered to be the starship USS Enterprise.

Components
Starfleet has many components, including:

Starfleet Academy

As early as the original Star Trek, characters refer to attending Starfleet Academy. Later series establish it as an officer training facility with a four-year educational program. The main campus is located near Starfleet Headquarters in what is now Fort Baker, California.

Starfleet Command
Starfleet Command is the headquarters/command center of Starfleet. The term "Starfleet Command" is first used in TOS episode "Court Martial". Its headquarters are depicted as being in Fort Baker, across the Golden Gate from San Francisco, in Star Trek: The Motion Picture and Star Trek IV: The Voyage Home. Overlooking the Command from the other side of the Golden Gate is the permanent site of the Council of the United Federation of Planets in what is now the Presidio of San Francisco. Throughout the Star Trek franchise, the main characters' isolation from Starfleet Command compels them to make and act upon decisions without Starfleet Command's orders or information, particularly in Voyager when the main protagonists have no means of contacting Earth for several years.

Starfleet Shipyards
StarTrek.com notes that many of Starfleet's ships are built on Mare Island near San Francisco. It states:

Located on San Francisco's Mare Island, with additional starship assembly facilities located in Earth orbit, Starfleet's San Francisco Navy Yards is the site where the USS Enterprise NCC-1701 was built in 2245. Captain Robert April, the Enterprises first commanding officer, was present at the San Francisco Navy Yards when the vessel's major components were built and prepared for assembly in Starfleet's orbital drydock facilities (episode, "The Counter-Clock Incident").

The Enterprise-D and USS Voyager are depicted to have been constructed at a shipyard named Utopia Planitia in Mars orbit. Utopia Planitia served as Starfleet's main ship yards throughout a large portion of Starfleet's existence. After the Enterprise-D encountered the Borg in the episode "Q Who" the size of the Utopia Planitia shipyards was doubled out of fear of a Borg strike. They were once again doubled after the Dominion threat became more evident. A devastating attack on these shipyards is a major plot point in Star Trek: Picard.

In the 2009 film, the Enterprise is shown under construction near James T. Kirk's home in Iowa. In the 2013 sequel, Montgomery "Scotty" Scott discovers a covert Starfleet facility, near Jupiter, that has built a much larger Federation warship, USS Vengeance.

Starfleet Engineering Corps
The Starfleet Engineering Corps (also called the Starfleet Corps of Engineers) is mentioned in several episodes in conjunction with projects such as hollowing out the underground laboratory complex inside the Regula I asteroid in Star Trek II: The Wrath of Khan, the design of the Yellowstone-class Runabout in the alternate timeline in the Star Trek: Voyager episode "Non Sequitur", and devising a defense against the Breen energy-dampening weapon in the Star Trek: Deep Space Nine episode "When It Rains..." As a result of these successes, Starfleet engineers gained a reputation as the undisputed masters of technological adaptation and modification. As one minion of the Dominion in the Star Trek: DS9 episode, "Rocks and Shoals" notes, Starfleet engineers are reputed to be able to "Turn rocks into replicators."

Additionally, Pocket Books has published a series of eBooks and novels in the Starfleet Corps of Engineers series.

Starfleet Intelligence
Starfleet Intelligence is an intelligence agency of the United Federation of Planets. It is entrusted with foreign and domestic espionage, counter-espionage, and state security.

Starfleet Judge Advocate General

The Starfleet Judge Advocate General (or JAG) is the branch charged with overseeing legal matters within Starfleet. Several episodes revolve around or involve JAG officers and procedures:
 Captain James T. Kirk is the defendant in the TOS episode "Court Martial".
 Data participates in a JAG hearing to determine whether he is Starfleet property in the TNG episode "The Measure of a Man".
 A hearing is held to decide whether to extradite Worf to the Klingons in the DS9 episode "Rules of Engagement".
 In "Doctor Bashir, I Presume?", a JAG rear admiral arranges for Richard Bashir's incarceration—and his son Julian Bashir's retention of a Starfleet commission—as punishment for the illegal genetic enhancements given to Julian as a child.

Dialog in "Court Martial" reveals that a court-martial may be convened in the absence of any JAG officers by three presiding command-level officers. Additionally, dialog in "The Measure of a Man" indicates that the loss of a starship automatically leads to a JAG court-martial. Courts-martial were held following the loss of the USS Pegasus and USS Stargazer. In the Voyager episode "Parallax", Tuvok states that the Captain has the authority to conduct a court-martial on the ship, given the circumstance of the ship being isolated from the Federation.

Starfleet Medical
Starfleet Medical is the medical branch of Starfleet.

Gates McFadden, who played Dr. Beverly Crusher, left Star Trek: The Next Generation during its second season. The character is described during this season, and after her return, as having been assigned to Starfleet Medical.

Starfleet Operations
Numerous star ship dedication plaques identify other personnel associated with Starfleet Operations. Rear Admiral James T. Kirk served 18 months as Starfleet's Chief of Operations.

Starfleet Security
Starfleet Security is an agency of Starfleet referred to in several episodes of Star Trek: The Next Generation and Star Trek: Deep Space Nine. Security is a branch of Starfleet first introduced in the original Star Trek. Main characters in subsequent series have been security officers.

Starfleet Tactical
Starfleet Tactical is a rarely mentioned department in Starfleet that is responsible for planning defensive strategies, as well as engaging in weapons research and development.

Different species in Starfleet
Although Humans are the most-often-seen crew members onscreen, Starfleet is shown to be composed of individuals from over 150 species, with Vulcans perhaps being the most common aliens seen.

Already in TOS, the USS Enterprise and other ships have a mixed-species crew, although this does not appear to be an absolute rule; for instance, the episode "The Immunity Syndrome" refers to the USS Intrepid as having an all-Vulcan crew. The Star Trek: Deep Space Nine episode "Take Me Out to the Holosuite" also features such a crew, serving aboard the USS T'Kumbra.

In keeping with this idea, Star Trek: Enterprise, in its first two seasons, was the only show to have an entirely human crew, as it was set before the formation of the Federation, although the vessel did carry Phlox, a Denobulan serving in a medical exchange program, and T'Pol, then serving as an observer from the Vulcan High Command.

Star Trek: The Next Generation saw the introduction of Starfleet's first Klingon officer. Other races—such as Bolians, Betazoids, and Trill—were seen, and given more central roles, in later series; some of these, notably Klingons, had been shown as enemies in earlier episodes.

Various episodes show that Earth/Federation citizenship is not a necessary pre-condition for joining Starfleet. T'Pol of Vulcan is shown to be the first non-human Starfleet officer, receiving a commission as a commander following the Xindi mission and her resignation from the Vulcan High Command. Even after the Federation's formation citizenship was not required; several officers are from planets that are not part of the Federation. For example, Star Trek: TNGs Ensign Ro Laren, a Bajoran aboard the USS Enterprise-D; her fellow Bajoran Kira Nerys, who was field-commissioned as a Starfleet commander so that she could aid the Cardassian resistance during the Dominion War; and Ferengi Nog, who enters Starfleet Academy in season four of Deep Space Nine; all were from non-member planets. In addition, Quinn and Icheb from Star Trek: Voyager both spoke of joining Starfleet.

An example of the process imagined by the writers is given when the character Nog attempts to apply to the Academy. He is told that since he is from a non-member world (Ferenginar), he requires a letter of recommendation from a command-level officer before his application can be considered, with the implication that this is the standard procedure for all non-Federation applicants to Starfleet.

In the Star Trek Expanded Universe, an example of what typically becomes of a new Federation member world's military is depicted when the Bajoran Militia is integrated into Starfleet upon Bajor's entry into the Federation.

See also
 Star Trek uniforms

References

External links

Fictional elements introduced in 1966
Star Trek organizations
Space navies